"Hell to the Naw Naw" is a song by Bishop Bullwinkle. It became a viral Internet meme in 2014.

Background
The song was originally released on January 1, 2014. Bullwinkle is seen in a white suit, wearing sunglasses and a black in the outdoors shot video. Objects seen in the video are monkey and fire extinguisher resting on a podium. By July 22, 2015, the video went viral, attracting 200,000 views with over 4,000 likes. As of March 30, 2019, a video of the song had attracted 35,214,554 views and 258,627 likes. Another video has attracted 10,893,615 views and 186,611 likes. The song was even played on NBC.

A spin-off of sorts is a video of an 86 year old grandmother dancing to the song. The video went viral in a very short time. Claudia Haggerty dancing to the song in the video which was uploaded by her granddaughter Beverly Jenkins.  By September 4, 2015, it had attracted three million views since it was posted. It was also shared over 100,000 times on Facebook.

The song is referenced in Ted E. Johnson's "This Is a Man’s World" . . . Not.

Composition
The song is in the key of A major.

Reception 
The reactions to the video and song have been mixed with some praising it while others are voicing their condemnation. The song is about the hypocrisy of some preachers.

References

External links
 Official Bronshay: Bishop Bullwinkel - Hell to the naw naw
 Bishop Bullwinkle: Bishop Bullwinkle Hell To Da Naw,Naw,Naw With Da Bicycle
 2017 Southern Soul Music Awards

Internet memes introduced in 2014
2014 songs
Viral videos
2014 YouTube videos